Julie Price may refer to:

 Julie Arthur (née Price, born 1966/67), wife of the former Prime Minister of Barbados Owen Arthur
 Julie Price (bassoonist) (born 1965), English bassoonist
 Julie C. Price, American physicist and professor of radiology